Peter Crampton (born 4 June 1969) is a male former British athlete, born in Grimsby.

Athletics career
Crampton represented England and won the gold medal in the 4 x 400 metres relay at the 1994 Commonwealth Games held in Victoria, British Columbia, Canada, along with teammates, David McKenzie, Adrian Patrick, and Du'aine Ladejo and heat runners Alex Fugallo and Mark Smith. He also competed in the 400 metres hurdles event.

He also competed in the 400 metres hurdles at the 1996 Summer Olympics.

References

1969 births
Living people
Sportspeople from Grimsby
British male hurdlers
British male sprinters
Commonwealth Games gold medallists for England
Athletes (track and field) at the 1994 Commonwealth Games
Olympic athletes of Great Britain
Athletes (track and field) at the 1996 Summer Olympics
Commonwealth Games medallists in athletics
Medallists at the 1994 Commonwealth Games